Jewish Party may refer to:

 Jewish Party (Czechoslovakia), a party of the First Czechoslovak Republic
 Jewish Party (Romania), a party in Romania
 Jewish Conservative Party, a party of the First Czechoslovak Republic
 Jewish Economic Party, a party of the First Czechoslovak Republic
 Jewish National Party (Jüdischnationale Partei), an Austrian political party
 General Jewish Labour Party, a party in Poland
 Independent Jewish Workers Party, a party in Russia

See also 
 Jewish Communist Party (disambiguation)